The Poet Laureate Has Gone to His Shed is a British podcast and BBC Radio 4 programme in which the Poet Laureate Simon Armitage speaks to an invited guest, usually in his writing-shed of his Yorkshire home. The first series of twelve hour-long broadcasts began in March 2020, just before the COVID-19 pandemic, the second series of nine began in July 2021, and the third series began in February 2023. The programme broadcast on 27 May 2020 was recorded while Armitage was self-isolating during the COVID-19 pandemic, and was the last of the first series.

The broadcasts were recorded in Armitage's writing shed in the garden of his home in West Yorkshire. The contents of the shed include "a harmonium, a pizza oven, a daybed, books on birdspotting, a decent spread of music cassettes, and an impressive collection of sherry", and he has described it as "close to nature without camping on the lawn, it's half inside and half outside".  Armitage and his guest have a wide-ranging conversation, often touching on his ongoing translation of the medieval poem The Owl and the Nightingale, and the guest answers a series of quick-fire questions such as "night or day, north or south, Woman's Hour or In Our Time?" before being offered a glass of sherry.

In series 3, broadcast in 2023, the podcast available on BBC Sounds was up to 60 mins long but only a shortened version of 30 mins was broadcast on Radio 4.

Episodes

References

External links
 

BBC Radio 4 programmes
2020 radio programme debuts